Marjorie and Men is a British comedy television series which originally aired on ITV in 1985. A recently divorced woman tries to revive her love life while living with her meddling mother.

Main cast
 Patricia Routledge as Marjorie Belton
 Patricia Hayes as Alice Tripp
 James Cossins as Henry Bartlett
 Ronnie Stevens as Sid Parkin
 Jeanne Watts as Beryl
 Michelle Collins as Debbie

References

Bibliography
 Maxford, Howard. Hammer Complete: The Films, the Personnel, the Company. McFarland, 2018.
 Newcomb, Horace . Encyclopedia of Television. Routledge, 2014.

External links
 

1985 British television series debuts
1985 British television series endings
1980s British comedy television series
ITV sitcoms
English-language television shows
Television shows produced by Anglia Television